The Great Sioux Nation: Sitting in Judgment on America is a book edited by Roxanne Dunbar-Ortiz, "An Oral History of the Sioux Nation and Its Struggle for Sovereignty", that documents the 1974 "Lincoln Treaty Hearing". Testimony produced during that hearing has been cited by the International Indian Treaty Council in advocating for Indigenous sovereignty and treaty rights, efforts which eventually saw the 2007 Declaration on the Rights of Indigenous Peoples.

The 'Lincoln Treaty Hearing' took place in December 1974, in a US District Court in Lincoln, Nebraska, as part of the long series of court proceedings which followed the 1973 Wounded Knee Siege. The court heard approximately 65 people during thirteen days and produced almost 3,000 pages of testimony. Among the activists and scholars who participated were Simon J. Ortiz, Vine Deloria, Jr., Alvin M. Josephy, Jr., Leonard Crow Dog, Russell Means, William S. Laughlin, Raymond J. DeMallie, Beatrice Medicine, Gladys Bissonette, Dennis Banks, and Roxanne Dunbar Ortiz. Judge Warren Keith Urbom presided.

The book was first published in 1977. A new edition in 2013 by the University of Nebraska Press contains a new foreword by Philip J. Deloria and a new introduction by Roxanne Dunbar Ortiz.

Selected excerpts

Selected book bibliography
 Anderson et al., Voices from Wounded Knee 1973 (Akwesasne Notes, 1974). .
 Dennis Banks, Ojibwa Warrior (University of Oklahoma Press, 2005)
 Dee Brown, Bury My Heart at Wounded Knee (Holt, Rinehart, and Winston, 1970). 
 Daniel M. Cobb, Native American Activism in Cold War America: The Struggle for Sovereignty (University Press of Kansas, 2008)
 Elizabeth Cook-Lynn, A Separate Country: Postcoloniality and American Indian Nations (Texas Tech University Press, 2012).
 Vine Deloria, Jr., Behind the Trail of Broken Treaties: An Indian Declaration of Independence (University of Texas Press, 1974,'10)
 Charles Eastman, Indian Heroes and Great Chieftains (Little, Brown and Company, 1918)   text
 Mario Gonzalez and Elizabeth Cook-Lynn, The Politics of Hallowed Ground: Wounded Knee and the Struggle for Indian Sovereignty (University of Illinois Press, 1999)
 Alvin M. Josephy, Jr., The Patriot Chiefs (Penguin Books, 1961,'93)
 Peter Matthiessen, In the Spirit of Crazy Horse (Viking Penguin, 1983,'92)
 Russell Means, Where White Men Fear to Tread (St. Martin's Press, 1995)
 Mari Sandoz, Crazy Horse (Alfred A. Knopf, 1942)
 Paul Chaat Smith & Robert Allen Warrior, Like a Hurricane: The Indian Movement from Alcatraz to Wounded Knee (The New Press, 1997)
 Luther Standing Bear, My People the Sioux (Houghton Mifflin Company, 1928)
 Warren Urbom, Called to Justice: The Life of a Federal Trial Judge (University of Nebraska Press, 2012).

External links
  Publisher webpage:  The Great Sioux Nation 

Sioux
Non-fiction books about Native Americans
Native American history of Nebraska
1977 non-fiction books
Random House books
Books about Nebraska
Books by Roxanne Dunbar-Ortiz